Bejaranoa semistriata is a species of flowering plant in the genus Bejaranoa. This species is accepted and is endemic to Brazil.

References

Flora of South America
Eupatorieae